Montalto Pavese is a comune (municipality) in the Province of Pavia in the Italian region Lombardy, located about 50 km south of Milan and about 25 km south of Pavia. As of 31 December 2004, it had a population of 941 and an area of 19.1 km².

Montalto Pavese borders the following municipalities: Borgo Priolo, Borgoratto Mormorolo, Calvignano, Lirio, Montecalvo Versiggia, Mornico Losana, Oliva Gessi, Pietra de' Giorgi, Rocca de' Giorgi, and Ruino.

Demographic evolution

References

Cities and towns in Lombardy